Toronto—St. Paul's is a federal electoral district in Toronto, Ontario, Canada, that has been represented in the House of Commons of Canada since 1935. Its current MP is Carolyn Bennett. Prior to the 2015 election, the riding was known as St. Paul's.

The small but densely populated riding covers the area to the north and northeast of Downtown Toronto (often called "Midtown" Toronto). In the past, it had been considered a bellwether riding, having been represented by only three opposition MPs. However, like most Toronto-based ridings, the Liberals have dominated recent elections. Since the Liberals won all but one seat in Ontario in their 1993 landslide, they have won all but one election in St. Paul's by 10,000 votes or more.

As of 2015, it includes the southern two-thirds of the wealthy Toronto neighbourhood of Forest Hill, plus the neighbourhoods of Deer Park, Davisville Village, Chaplin Estates, South Hill, Humewood-Cedarvale, the southern two-thirds of Fairbank, and the northern half of Summerhill.

Demographics
According to the Canada 2021 Census

Ethnic groups: 63.9% White, 6.3% South Asian, 6.0% Black, 5.0% Chinese, 4.5% Filipino, 4.1% Latin American, 2.0% West Asian, 1.8% Korean, 1.1% Indigenous, 1.0% Arab, 1.0% Southeast Asian
Languages: 62.3% English, 3.7% Spanish, 2.9% Portuguese, 2.2% Tagalog, 1.8% French, 1.8% Mandarin, 1.6% Italian, 1.5% Russian, 1.5% Persian, 1.3% Korean, 1.3% Cantonese
Religions: 40.9% Christian (21.1% Catholic, 3.7% Anglican, 3.5% Christian Orthodox, 2.1% United Church, 10.5% Other), 15.1% Jewish, 3.7% Muslim, 3.2% Hindu, 1.1% Buddhist, 34.8% None

Median income: $50,400 (2020)
Average income: $96,000 (2020)

History

The riding of Toronto—St. Pauls was created in 1933 from parts of the Toronto East Centre, Toronto Northeast, Toronto South and Toronto West Centre ridings.

It consisted initially of the central part of the City of Toronto ("Downtown Toronto"). It was bounded on the south by Toronto Bay, on the east by Sherbourne Street and on the north and west by a line drawn from Sherbourne Street west along Bloor Street, north along Yonge Street, northwest along the belt line railway, south and west along the western limit of the city, south along Dunvegan Road, east along St. Clair Avenue, south along Poplar Plains Road, west along Dupont Street, south along St. George and Beverley Streets, east along Queen Street, south along John Street.

In 1947, it was redefined to consist of the part of the city of Toronto bounded on the south by Toronto Bay, on the east by a line drawn from the Bay north along Sherbourne Street, west along Bloor Street East and north along Yonge Street, on the north by the south boundary of Ward Nine of the city of Toronto, and on the west by a line drawn from the Bay north on John Street, west along Queen Street West, north on Beverley Street and along St. George Street, east along Dupont Street, north along Davenport Road and Poplar Plains Road, west along St. Clair Avenue West, north along Dunvegan Road, east and north along the city limit to the southern boundary of Ward Nine.

In 1966, the southern part of the riding, what would be considered to be "Downtown Toronto" was removed from the electoral district (added to Rosedale electoral district) and the riding was shifted northward redefined to consist of the part of Metropolitan Toronto bounded by a line drawn from Bloor Street, north along Yonge Street, northwest along the Canadian National Railway line, north along Elmsthorpe Avenue, west along Eglinton Avenue, north along Castlewood Road, west along Briar Hill Avenue, south along Old Park Road and Glen Cedar Road, southeast along Claxton Boulevard, south along Bathurst Street and east along Bloor Street to Yonge Street.

In 1987, it was redefined to consist of the part of the cities of Toronto and York bounded by a line drawn from the Canadian Pacific Railway line north along Ossington Avenue, east along Davenport Road, north along Winona Drive, west along Eglinton Avenue West, north and east along the eastern limit of the City of York, east and north along the northern limit of the City of Toronto, south along Yonge Street and westerly along the CPR line to Ossington Avenue (removing lands between the CPR lands and Bloor Street).

In 1996, it was redefined to consist of the part of the cities of Toronto and York bounded by a line drawn from the Canadian Pacific Railway north along Ossington Avenue, east along Davenport Road, north along Winona Drive, west along Eglinton Avenue West, north along the eastern limit of the City of York, east along the northern limit of the City of Toronto, south along Bathurst Street, southeast along the Belt Line (formerly the Canadian National Railway), east along Eglinton Avenue West, north along Yonge Street, east along Broadway Avenue, south and east along the eastern limit of the City of Toronto, west along the south side of the Mount Pleasant Cemetery, south along the ravine situated east of Avoca Avenue, west along Rosehill Avenue, south and east along the west side of the Rosehill Reservoir, west along Woodlawn Avenue East, south along Yonge Street, and west along the Canadian Pacific Railway to Ossington Avenue.

In 2003, it was redefined to consist of the part of the City of Toronto bounded by a line drawn from the Canadian Pacific Railway north along Ossington Avenue, east along Davenport Road, north along Winona Drive, west along Holland Park Avenue, north along Oakwood Avenue, west along Rogers Road, north along Dufferin Street, east along Eglinton Avenue West, north along Yonge Street, east along Broadway Avenue, south along the former eastern limit of the City of Toronto, west along the south side of the Mount Pleasant Cemetery, southeast along the Don River Tributary situated east of Avoca Avenue, west along Rosehill Avenue, south along the west side of the Rosehill Reservoir, west along Jackes Avenue, south along Yonge Street and west along the Canadian Pacific Railway to Ossington Avenue.

In the 2012 electoral redistribution, St. Paul's lost territory to Don Valley West, gained a small fraction from Davenport and was renamed Toronto—St. Paul's.

Churches named for St Paul in the electoral district 

From its creation until 1966, the electoral district included two prominent churches named for St Paul the apostle: St. Paul's, Bloor Street at 227 Bloor Street East, which is the largest Anglican church in Toronto by seating capacity; and St. Paul's-Avenue Road United Church at Avenue Road and Webster Avenue, which was the church of many of Toronto's elite. The electoral district ceased to include 227 Bloor Street East after a redefinition of the district's boundaries in 1966. In 1980, the congregation at St. Paul's-Avenue Road United Church moved to 427 Bloor Street West during a church merger creating Trinity-St. Paul's United Church. The electoral district ceased to include 427 Bloor Street West after a boundary redefinition in 1987. Therefore, Toronto—St Paul's no longer contains a St Paul's.

Members of Parliament

This riding has elected the following Members of Parliament:

Election results

Toronto—St. Paul's, 2015–present

St. Paul's, 1935–2015

*Comparison to total of Progressive Conservative and Canadian Alliance vote in 2000.

Note: Canadian Alliance vote is compared to the Reform vote in 1997 election.

Note: NDP vote is compared to CCF vote in 1958 election.

Note: Progressive Conservative vote is compared to "National Government" vote in 1940 election.

Note: "National Government" vote is compared to Conservative vote in 1935 election.

See also
 List of Canadian federal electoral districts
 Past Canadian electoral districts

References

Notes

External links
1933–1966 Riding history from the Library of Parliament
1966-present Riding history from the Library of Parliament
2011 results from Elections Canada
Campaign expense data from Elections Canada

Federal electoral districts of Toronto
Ontario federal electoral districts
1933 establishments in Ontario